The Puyallup River is a river in the U.S. state of Washington. It flows generally northwest, emptying into Commencement Bay, part of Puget Sound.

The river's watershed is the youngest in the Puget Sound region, having been formed from a series of lahars starting about 5,600 years ago. The valley's 150,000 residents are at risk from future lahars. For this reason, the United States Geological Survey has installed a lahar warning system.

Course
The Puyallup River begins in two forks, the North Puyallup River and the South Puyallup River. Both originate at glaciers on Mount Rainier. The North Puyallup River flows from the toe of Puyallup Glacier, while the South Puyallup River flows from Tahoma Glacier. The two streams flow through the western part of Mount Rainier National Park, joining just outside the park boundary  and forming the Puyallup River proper.

The main Puyallup River flows north and northwest from Mount Rainier. The tributary Mowich River, which also flows from glaciers on Mount Rainier, joins the Puyallup from the east. Below the Mowich confluence, the Puyallup River flows through a rugged region of mountains and foothills. The river is dammed at Electron Diversion Dam shortly below the Mowich confluence. The dam diverts a portion of the Puyallup River into a long flume, which runs for several miles to Electron, where the water is passed through turbines in a hydroelectric powerhouse before being returned to the river. The Puyallup River passes through a steep and narrow gorge between Electron Dam and the powerhouse.

After Electron the river turns north and flows by the city of Orting, where it is joined by the Carbon River from the east. Like the Mowich, the Carbon River also originates at a glacier on Mount Rainier (the Carbon Glacier). The Puyallup continues its northernly course after Orting. At Sumner, the river is joined by the White River, another glacier-fed river. At the White River confluence, the Puyallup River turns northwest, flowing by the cities of Puyallup and Fife, and through the Puyallup Indian Reservation, before emptying into Commencement Bay at the Port of Tacoma, part of the city of Tacoma.

Natural history
The Puyallup River and its main tributaries originate in the glaciers of Mount Rainier. These glaciers continually provide sediment such as silt and gravel to the rivers, creating sand and gravel bars. The thick sediment deposits in the stream beds lower water capacity, which causes the river to meander and flood during periods of high streamflow. It also causes the rivers to become braided and meandering. During the summer glacial meltwater dominates the streamflow, turning the Puyallup River turbid. In addition, the glaciers delay the onset of spring-summer runoff, compared to unglaciated river basins.

Historically, these factors resulted in frequent flooding and extensive floodplain wetlands, and provided a rich and complex habitat for fish and other animals. In addition, the river's mouth at Commencement Bay occupied an extensive tidal flat and wetland estuary delta. Urbanization and an extensive system of flood control structures such as dams, levees, and culverts, have radically altered much of the Puyallup River and its tributaries. The estuary delta at the mouth of the Puyallup River has been almost completely replaced with the facilities of the Port of Tacoma, with less than 5% of the original estuarine habitat remaining.

A fall run of chinook salmon occurs on the river. coho, chum, and pink salmon are also found in the river, along with steelhead, sea-run coastal cutthroat trout, and a threatened species, bull trout. Sockeye salmon are considered indigenous to the basin, but are rarely seen today.

River modifications

The Puyallup River and its main tributary, the White River, have been subjected to major modifications during the 20th century. The Puyallup River between Sumner and its mouth at Tacoma was straightened. A diversion dam was built at Game Farm Park in 1914 to prevent the White River from flowing on its natural course into the Green River at Auburn; since then it has flowed into the Puyallup River instead of the Green River. Flood protection structures were built along many rivers in the basin, including extensive levees. A flood storage reservoir, Mud Mountain Lake, was created on the White River with the construction of Mud Mountain Dam. As part of the flood control efforts, river channels and embankments have been generally kept clear of debris such as gravel bars, large trees, logjams, and other woody debris. These modifications have radically altered the natural character of the rivers. River widths have been generally reduced. Water now fills nearly all of the land between river banks, instead of the historic pattern of braided meanders and wetlands.

History
The river is named for the Puyallup tribe, who lived throughout the river basin. After the Treaty of Medicine Creek and the Puget Sound War the Puyallup were granted a reservation on the lower Puyallup River. The Treaty of Medicine Creek recognized native fishing rights on the Puyallup River. These rights were ignored for decades until Bob Satiacum was arrested in 1954 for fishing illegally on the river. His legal case continued for years and resulted in the 1974 Boldt Decision, which granted half of all fishing rights in Washington state to native tribes.

The Puyallup tribe continues to maintain several buildings and properties on reservation lands near the mouth of the river. They are stakeholders in many issues about the river, such as the amount of water diverted at Electron Diversion Dam.

The first known European to explore the Puyallup River valley was William Fraser Tolmie, who in August 1833 made a journey to the Mount Rainier area via the Puyallup and Mowich river valleys. Two Native American guides accompanied Tolmie, Lachalet, a Nisqually Indian, and Nuckalkat, a Puyallup.

See also
 List of crossings of the Puyallup River
 List of Washington rivers

References

External links
Puyallup River Basin
Mount Rainier Volcano Lahar Warning System
US Corps of Engineers Water Management
NW River Forecast Center Puyallup @ Orting
NW River Forecast Center Puyallup @ Puyallup
NOAA Advanced Hydrologic Prediction Service Puyallup @ Puyallup
Trends in Streamflow and Comparisons with Instream Flows in the Lower Puyallup River Basin, Washington United States Geological Survey

 
Rivers of Washington (state)
Rivers of Pierce County, Washington
Puyallup, Washington
Mount Rainier
Puyallup Indian Reservation